Romanticide may refer to:

 "Romanticide", a song from the Nightwish album Once
 "Romanticide", a song by Combo Audio
 "Love Is War (Romanticide)", a song by September Mourning from their debut album Melancholia